Geneng Station (station code: GG) is a third-class railway station in Tepas, Geneng, Ngawi Regency, East Java, Indonesia, operated by Kereta Api Indonesia, located 200 m southwest of Soedono Sugar Refinery Mill. This railway station is at the most southeastern railway station in Ngawi Regency. This station's new building is operated—which has four tracks (two main lines and two passing tracks)—since Babadan–Geneng double track segment activation on 16 October 2019 and Geneng–Kedungbanteng on 30 November 2019.

Services 
This railway station has no train services except for train overtaking.

Gallery

References

External links 

 Kereta Api Indonesia - Indonesian railway company's official website

Ngawi Regency
Railway stations in East Java